David A. Hardy (born 10 April 1936) is a British space artist.

Early life
David Hardy was born 10. April 1936 in Bournville, UK. He studied at the Margaret Street College of Art in Birmingham, and was soon painting for the British Interplanetary Society.

Career
He started his career as an employee in the Design Office of Cadbury's, where he created packaging and advertising art for the company's confectionery; but was already illustrating books for e.g. Patrick Moore.

His first science fiction art was published in 1970, but he has gone on to illustrate hundreds of covers for books, and for magazines such as The Magazine of Fantasy and Science Fiction and Analog Science Fiction and Science Fact. His work also appears regularly in magazines such as Astronomy, Sky & Telescope, Astronomy Now and Popular Astronomy, for which he also writes articles.

Jon Gustafson and Peter Nicholls write that he is "known as much for his astronomical paintings in the accurate tradition of Chesley Bonestell as for his sf work... Some of his best early work was to illustrate a nonfiction book by Patrick Moore, Suns, Myths, and Men (1954)." Gustafson and Nicholls remark that The Magazine of Fantasy and Science Fiction was "the magazine for which he developed his famous "Space Gumby 'Bhen'," a green alien which lent humour to his vivid astronomical scenes. He was an important artist for Vision of Tomorrow and worked also for Science Fiction Monthly, If and Galaxy."

He is European Vice President of the International Association of Astronomical Artists, and a former Vice President of the Association of Science Fiction and Fantasy Artists.

He has been Artist Guest of Honour at a number of science fiction conventions, including Stucon, Albacon, Armadacon, Novacon, the 2007 Eurocon, and Illustrious, the 2011 Eastercon. He was also a guest speaker at the 2012 Microcon at Exeter University.

Major books
 Challenge of the Stars (with Patrick Moore) (1972), revised as New Challenge of the Stars 1978
 Galactic Tours (with Bob Shaw) (1981)
 Atlas of the Solar System (1982/1986)
 Visions of Space (Dragon's World, 1989)
 Hardyware: The Art of David A. Hardy (text by Chris Morgan]; Paper Tiger UK/Sterling US 2001)
 Aurora: A Child of Two Worlds (novel; Cosmos Books, 2003), (Updated and revised edition, August 2012; Wildside Press)
 Futures: 50 Years in Space (text by Sir Patrick Moore, AAPPL/HarperCollins 2004), (Paperback 50 Years in Space AAPPL 2006)

Awards and honours
 1979 Nominated for the Hugo Award for Best Professional Artist.
 1987 Won 'Best European SF Artist' award.
 2001 Won the Lucien Rudaux Memorial Award.
 2003, 2004, 2005, 2007 Best cover art, readers award, Analog Science Fiction and Science Fact.
 2005 FUTURES was nominated for the Hugo Award for Best Related Book.
 2005 FUTURES received the Sir Arthur Clarke Award for 'Best Written Presentation'
• 2015 received the Ordway Award for 'Sustained Excellence in Spaceflight History'.
 2019 was elected an Honorary Fellow of the British Interplanetary Society.
 Asteroid 13329 Davidhardy, discovered 1998 by Spacewatch at Kitt Peak has been named after him.

References

External links
 David A. Hardy/AstroArt website : Books, prints, originals, and a Music/Art DVD. 
 Hardyware: The Art of David A Hardy (Review by Ron Miller)

1936 births
Living people
Analog Science Fiction and Fact people
English illustrators
Science fiction artists
British speculative fiction artists
People from Birmingham, West Midlands
Space artists
Alumni of the Birmingham School of Art